Irene Cara Escalera (March 18, 1959 – November 25, 2022) was an American singer, songwriter, and actress who rose to prominence for her role as Coco Hernandez in the 1980 musical film Fame, and for recording the film's title song "Fame", which reached  1 in several countries.

In 1983, Cara co-wrote and sang the song "Flashdance... What a Feeling" (from the film Flashdance), for which she shared an Academy Award for Best Original Song and won a Grammy Award for Best Female Pop Vocal Performance in 1984. Before her success with Fame, Cara portrayed the title character Sparkle Williams in the original 1976 musical drama film Sparkle.

Early life 
Irene Cara Escalera was born on March 18, 1959, and raised in the Bronx, New York City, the youngest of five children. Her father, Gaspar Cara, a steel factory worker and retired saxophonist, was Puerto Rican, and her mother, Louise Escalera, a movie theater usher, was Cuban. Cara had two sisters and two brothers. She began to play the piano by ear, studied music, acting, and dance seriously, and began taking dance lessons when she was five. Her performing career started with her singing and dancing professionally on Spanish-language television. She made early TV appearances on The Original Amateur Hour (singing in Spanish) and Johnny Carson's The Tonight Show. In 1971–1972, she was a regular on PBS's educational program The Electric Company as a member of the Short Circus, the show's band. As a child, Cara recorded a Spanish-language record for the Latin market and an English-language Christmas album. She also appeared in a major concert tribute to Duke Ellington, which featured Stevie Wonder, Sammy Davis Jr., and Roberta Flack. Cara attended the Professional Children's School in Manhattan. In 1985, Cara told Cosmopolitan "I don't mean to sound immodest but I'd never had any doubt that I'd be successful, nor any fear of success, I was raised as a little goddess who was told she would be a star."

Career 

Cara appeared in Broadway and off-Broadway shows, starting with Maggie Flynn opposite Shirley Jones and Jack Cassidy. Shortly thereafter, she was one of five finalists for the "Little Miss America" pageant. She also appeared in Via Galactica with Raúl Juliá, Ain't Misbehavin'  and The Me Nobody Knows (which won an Obie Award). Cara was the original Daisy Allen on the 1970s daytime serial Love of Life. She later took on the role of Angela in the romance/thriller Aaron Loves Angela, followed by her portrayal of the title character in Sparkle.

Television brought Cara international acclaim for serious dramatic roles in Roots: The Next Generations and Guyana Tragedy: The Story of Jim Jones. John Willis' Screen World, Vol. 28, named her one of twelve "Promising New Actors of 1976"; that same year, a readers' poll in Right On! magazine named her Top Actress.

Fame (1980) and international acclaim 
The 1980 hit film Fame, directed by Alan Parker, catapulted Cara to stardom. She originally was cast as a dancer, but when producers David Da Silva and Alan Marshall and screenwriter Christopher Gore heard her voice, they re-wrote the role of Coco Hernandez for her to play. In this part, she sang both the title song "Fame" and the single "Out Here on My Own", which were both nominated for the Academy Award for Best Original Song. These songs helped make the film's soundtrack a chart-topping, multi-platinum album, and it was the first time that two songs from the same film and sung by the same artist were nominated in the same category. Cara had the opportunity to be one of the few singers to perform more than one song at the Oscar ceremony; "Fame," written by Michael Gore and Dean Pitchford, won the award for best original song that year, and the film won the Academy Award for Best Original Score. Cara earned Grammy Award nominations in 1980 for Best New Artist and Best Female Pop Vocal Performance, as well as a Golden Globe nomination for Best Motion Picture Actress in a Musical. Billboard named her Top New Single Artist, and Cashbox magazine awarded her both Most Promising Female Vocalist and Top Female Vocalist. Asked by Fame TV series producers to reprise her role as Coco Hernandez, she declined, wanting to focus her attention on her recording career; Erica Gimpel assumed the role.

Post-Fame 1980–1999 
In 1980, she briefly played the role of Dorothy in The Wiz on tour, in a role that Stephanie Mills had portrayed in the original Broadway production. Coincidentally, Cara and Mills had shared the stage together as children in the original 1968 Broadway musical Maggie Flynn, starring Shirley Jones and Jack Cassidy, in which both young girls played American Civil War orphans.
Cara was set to star in the sitcom Irene in 1981. The cast had veteran performers Kaye Ballard and Teddy Wilson as well as newcomers Julia Duffy and Keenen Ivory Wayans. However, the pilot was not picked up by the network for the fall season. In 1983, Cara appeared as herself in the film D.C. Cab. One of the characters, Tyrone, played by Charlie Barnett, is an obsessed Cara fan who decorated his Checker Cab as a shrine to her. "The Dream (Hold On to Your Dream)", her contribution to the film's soundtrack, played over the closing credits of the film, and was a minor hit, peaking at No. 37 on the Billboard Hot 100 in February 1984.

In 1982, Cara earned the Image Award for Best Actress when she co-starred with Diahann Carroll and Rosalind Cash in the NBC Movie of the Week Sister, Sister. Cara portrayed Myrlie Evers-Williams in For Us the Living: The Medgar Evers Story, the PBS TV movie about civil rights leader Medgar Evers,  and she earned an NAACP Image Award Best Actress nomination. She also appeared in 1982's Killing 'em Softly. Cara continued to perform in live theater. 

In 1983, Cara reached the peak of her music career with the title song for the movie Flashdance: "Flashdance... What a Feeling", which she co-wrote with Giorgio Moroder and Keith Forsey. Cara wrote the lyrics to the song with Keith Forsey while riding in a car in New York heading to the studio to record it; Moroder composed the music. Cara admitted later that she was initially reluctant to work with Giorgio Moroder because she had no wish to invite comparisons with Donna Summer, another artist who worked with Moroder. The song became a hit in several countries, attracting several awards for Cara. She shared the 1983 Academy Award for Best Original Song with Moroder and Forsey, becoming the first black woman to win an Oscar in a non-acting category and the youngest to receive an Oscar for songwriting. She won the 1984 Grammy Award for Best Female Pop Vocal Performance, 1984 Golden Globe Award for Best Original Song, and American Music Awards for Best R&B Female Artist and Best Pop Single of the Year.

In 1984, she was in the comedic thriller City Heat, co-starring with Clint Eastwood and Burt Reynolds and singing the standards "Embraceable You" and "Get Happy". She also co-wrote the theme song "City Heat", sung by the jazz vocalist Joe Williams. In May 1984, she scored her final Top 40 hit with "Breakdance" going to No. 8. "You Were Made for Me" reached No. 78 that summer, but she did not appear on the Hot 100 again. In 1985, Cara co-starred with Tatum O'Neal in Certain Fury. In 1986, Cara appeared in the film Busted Up. She also provided the voice of Snow White in the unofficial sequel to Disney's Snow White and the Seven Dwarfs, Filmation's Happily Ever After, in 1993. The same year, she appeared as Mary Magdalene in a tour of Jesus Christ Superstar with Ted Neeley, Carl Anderson, and Dennis DeYoung.

Cara released three studio albums: Anyone Can See in 1982, What a Feelin' in 1983, and Carasmatic in 1987, the most successful of these being What a Feelin. In 1985, she collaborated with the Hispanic charity supergroup Hermanos in the song "Cantaré, cantarás", in which she sang a solo segment with the Spanish opera singer Plácido Domingo. Cara toured Europe and Asia throughout the 1990s, achieving several modest dance hits on European charts, but no U.S. chart hits. She released a compilation of Eurodance singles in the mid-to-late 1990s titled Precarious 90's. Cara also worked as a backup vocalist for Vicki Sue Robinson, Lou Reed, George Duke, Oleta Adams, and Evelyn "Champagne" King.

In 1993, a California jury awarded her $1.5 million from a 1985 lawsuit she filed against record executive Al Coury and Network Records, accusing them of withholding royalties from the Flashdance soundtrack and her first two solo records. Cara stated that, as a result, she was labeled as being difficult to work with and that the music industry "virtually blacklisted" her.

 21st century 
In March 2004, Cara received two honors with an induction into the Ciboney Cafe's Hall of Fame and a Lifetime Achievement Award presented at the sixth annual Prestige Awards. In June 2005, Cara won the third round of the NBC television series Hit Me, Baby, One More Time, performing "Flashdance... What a Feeling" and covered Anastacia's song "I'm Outta Love" with her all-female band Hot Caramel. At the 2006 AFL Grand Final in Melbourne, Cara performed a rendition of "Flashdance" as an opener to the pre-match entertainment.

In 2005, Cara contributed a dance single, titled "Forever My Love", to the compilation album titled Gay Happening Vol. 12.

, Cara had residences in both New Port Richey, Florida and Santa Fe, New Mexico. She was in Hot Caramel, a band which she formed in 1999. Their album, called Irene Cara Presents Hot Caramel, was released on April 4, 2011. Cara appeared in season 2 of CMT's reality show Gone Country.

 Personal life and death 
Cara married stuntman and film director Conrad Palmisano in Los Angeles on April 13, 1986. They divorced in 1991. Cara died at her home in Largo, Florida, on November 25, 2022, at the age of 63. The official cause of death was determined to be arteriosclerotic and hypertensive heart disease.

 Discography 

 Studio albums 

 Singles 
{| class="wikitable" style="text-align:center;"
|-
! rowspan="2"| Year
! rowspan="2"| Single
! colspan="10"| Peak chart positions
! rowspan="2"| Certifications
! rowspan="2"| Album
|- style="font-size:smaller;"
! width="35"| US
! width="35"| AUS
! width="35"| CAN
! width="35"| IRE
! width="35"| NLD
! width="35"| NZ
! width="35"|SWI
! width="35"| GER
! width="35"| FIN
! width="35"| UK
|-
| rowspan="3"| 1980
| align="left"| "Fame"
| 4
| 3
| 42
| 1
| 1
| 1
| —
| —
| 8
| 1
| align=left|
 MC: Gold
 BPI: Gold
 NVPI: Gold
| align="left" rowspan="3"| Fame
|-
| align="left"| "Hot Lunch Jam"
| —
| —
| —
| —
| —
| —
| —
| —
| —
| —
| align=left|
|-
| align="left"| "Out Here on My Own"
| 19
| 41
| —
| —
| —
| —
| —
| —
| —
| 58
| align=left|
|-
| rowspan="2"|1982
| align="left"| "Anyone Can See"
| 42
| —
| —
| —
| —
| —
| —
| —
| —
| —
| align=left|
| align="left" rowspan="2"| Anyone Can See
|-
| align="left"| "My Baby (He's Something Else)"
| —
| —
| —
| —
| —
| —
| —
| —
| —
| —
| align=left|
|-
| rowspan="3"| 1983
| align="left"| "Flashdance... What a Feeling"
| 1
| 1
| 1
| 2
| 17
| 1
| 1
| 3
| 2
| 2
| align=left|
 RIAA: Gold
 BPI: Silver
 MC: 2× Platinum
| align="left" rowspan="1"| Flashdance / What a Feelin'
|-
| align="left"| "Why Me?"
| 13
| 5
| 23
| —
| —
| 24
| 4
| 17
| 4
| 86
| align=left|
| align="left" rowspan="1"| What a Feelin'''
|-
| align="left"| "The Dream (Hold On to Your Dream)"
| 37
| 84
| —
| —
| —
| —
| —
| —
| —
| —
| align=left|
| align="left" rowspan="1"| D.C. Cab / What a Feelin
|-
| rowspan="2"| 1984
| align="left"| "Breakdance"
| 8
| 19
| 10
| —
| —
| 25
| 20
| 53
| 9
| 88
| align=left|
| align="left" rowspan="2"| What a Feelin'|-
| align="left"| "You Were Made for Me"
| 78
| —
| —
| —
| —
| —
| —
| —
| —
| —
| align=left|
|- 
| 1987
| align="left"| "Girlfriends"
| —
| —
| —
| —
| —
| —
| —
| —
| —
| —
| align=left|
| align="left" rowspan="1"| Carasmatic|-
| 2001
| align="left"| "What a Feeling" (with DJ BoBo)
| —
| —
| —
| —
| —
| —
| 2
| 3
| —
| —
| align=left|
| align="left" rowspan="1"| Planet Colors|-
| 2004
| align="left"| "Downtown"
| —
| —
| —
| —
| —
| —
| —
| —
| —
| —
| align=left|
| align="left" rowspan="1"| Downtown: A Street Tale|-
| colspan="15" style="font-size:90%" | "—" denotes a recording that did not chart or was not released in that territory.
|}

 Soundtrack appearances 

 Vocal appearances on other albums 

 1986: Brecker Brothers – Détente (background)
 1987: Jimmy Maelen – Beats Workin' 1992: Stanley Turrentine – Home Again 2001: DJ BoBo – Planet Colors 2002: DJ BoBo – Celebration Stage acting 
 1968: Maggie Flynn 1970: The Me Nobody Knows 1972: Via Galactica 1973: Lotta 1978: Ain't Misbehavin'  (replaced by Charlayne Woodard during previews)
 1979: Got Tu Go Disco 1980: The Wiz 1992: Jesus Christ Superstar 1996: What a Feeling!: The Rock & Pop Musicals in Concert''

Filmography

Television

Film

Awards and nominations

See also 

 List of artists who reached number one on the U.S. Dance Club Songs chart
 List of artists who reached number one in the United States
 List of Billboard number-one dance club songs
 List of Billboard number-one singles
 List of Puerto Ricans

Notes

References

External links 

 
 
 
 
 

1959 births
2022 deaths
20th-century African-American women singers
20th-century American actresses
20th-century American women pianists
21st-century African-American women singers
21st-century American women pianists
Age controversies
African-American women singer-songwriters
American child singers
American country singer-songwriters
American disco musicians
American film actresses
American musical theatre actresses
American people of Cuban descent
American people of Puerto Rican descent
American pop pianists
American stage actresses
American television actresses
American voice actresses
American women country singers
American women pop singers
Best Original Song Academy Award-winning songwriters
Country musicians from New York (state)
Deaths from arteriosclerosis
Deaths from hypertension
Elektra Records artists
Epic Records artists
Fiorello H. LaGuardia High School alumni
Geffen Records artists
Golden Globe Award-winning musicians
Grammy Award winners
Hispanic and Latino American actresses
Hispanic and Latino American dancers
Hispanic and Latino American women singers
Musicians from the Bronx
Participants in American reality television series
People of Afro–Puerto Rican descent
Singer-songwriters from New York (state)